Boothe Lake is a lake in Yosemite National Park, United States.

Boothe Lake was named in honor of Clyde Boothe, a park ranger.

See also
List of lakes in California

References

Lakes of Mariposa County, California
Lakes of Yosemite National Park